The Comedians is a British television show of the 1970s (later reprised in the mid-1980s and early 1990s) produced by Johnnie Hamp of Granada Television. The show gave a stage to nightclub and working men's club comedians of the era, including Russ Abbot, Jim Bowen and Bernard Manning. Filmed before a live audience in Manchester, comics each performed 20-minute sets, which were then edited together into half-hour shows featuring up to thirteen stand-up comics.

Working men's clubs were numerous in Britain, especially in the North of England and have been a useful training ground for artists, especially comedians. Most of these clubs are affiliated to the CIU (Working Men's Club and Institute Union) founded in 1862 by the Rev. Henry Solly. There are also political clubs, as well as Servicemen's Clubs affiliated to the Royal British Legion.

The Comedians began as an experiment for Granada TV and was popular during the earlier series, with an LP recording of the show reaching the best-seller charts, and several sell-out national tours following, including a season at the London Palladium. The programme won the Critics' Circle Award.

The comedy frequently took the form of anecdotes or jokes and often involved racist or sexist stereotypes. Like other British comedy successes of the day, notably, Love Thy Neighbour, this kind of entertainment was acceptable on British television during this period but would not be so today. Viewing the series in retrospect it stands as a major social document of the times.

Cast
Comedians appearing on the show included Russ Abbot (initially as Russ Roberts, later as Russ Abbott), Lennie Bennett, Stan Boardman, Jim Bowen, Jimmy Bright, Duggie Brown, Mike Burton, Dave Butler, Al Robbins, Brian Carroll, Frank Carson, Johnnie Casson, Eddie Colinton, Mike Coyne, Colin Crompton, Bob Curtiss, Pauline Daniels, Charlie Daze, Les Dennis, Vince Earl, Steve Faye, Ray Fell, Eddie Flanagan, Stu Francis, Mike Goddard (known as Mike Goodwin in the early years of the show), Ken Goodwin, Jackie Hamilton, Jerry Harris, Jimmy Jones, Mike Kelly, George King, Bobby Knutt, Bernard Manning, Jimmy Marshall, Mike McCabe, Paul Melba, Mick Miller, Pat Mooney, Hal Nolan, Tom O'Connor, Tom Pepper, Bryn Phillips, Don Reid, Mike Reid, George Roper, Harry Scott, Paul Shane, Pat Tansey, Sammy Thomas, Johnny Wager, Roy Walker, Jos White, Charlie Williams, Lee Wilson and Lenny Windsor.

Also featured on the series were Shep's Banjo Boys, a seven-piece band comprising (for the first five series) Charlie Bentley (tenor banjo), John Drury (sousaphone), Andy Holdorf (trombone), John Orchard (piano), John Rollings (drums), Graham Shepherd (banjo) and Howard Shepherd (lead banjo). In 1973, the line-up was Mike Dexter (banjo), Tony "Tosh" Kennedy (sousaphone), Ged Martin (drums), Tony Pritchard (trombone), Graham Shepherd (banjo) and Howard "Shep" Shepherd (lead banjo).

DVD releases
The first seven series including a DVD set (containing the first seven series broadcast 1971–74) have been released on DVD by Network.

Transmissions

Specials

See also
The Wheeltappers and Shunters Social Club

References

External links 
.
Classic Telly: Tributes to The Comedians.

ITV comedy
1971 British television series debuts
1993 British television series endings
1970s British comedy television series
1980s British comedy television series
1990s British comedy television series
Television series by ITV Studios
Television shows produced by Granada Television
English-language television shows